Guard is a surname. Notable people with the surname include:

Christopher Guard (born 1953), English actor
Dave Guard (1934–1991), American folk singer and songwriter, founding member of The Kingston Trio
Dominic Guard (born 1956), English actor
Jeremy Guard (born 1970), Australian rules footballer
John 'Jacky' Guard (born ca. 1791/92),  English convict,  an early settler in New Zealand, influential whaler and trader.
Kelly Guard (born 1983), Canadian ice hockey player
Philip Guard (born 1928), English actor
Pippa Guard (born 1952), British actress
Rick Guard, English singer-songwriter